Parul Gulati is an Indian actress who has appeared in several Punjabi films.

In (2017) Gulati appeared in the TV series P.O.W.- Bandi Yuddh Ke, and Haq Se (2018) Web Series - An adaptation of Little Women , Gulati plays "Jo March". In (2018), Gulati starred in Netflix production Selection Day is an Indian Netflix Original based on Aravind Adiga's 2016 novel of the same name . Girls Hostel (2018–19)for The Viral Fever Girliyapa .

In addition to acting in films, Gulati has endorsed multiple brands and products. She has her own line of Human Hair Extensions by the name of Nishhair.

Career
In 2010, she made her acting debut with television show  Kitani Mohabbat Hai (season 2). Next, she was seen in a daily soap opera, Yeh Pyaar Na Hoga kam, in a supporting role. Later in 2012, she acted in Burrraahh, in which she played Rose. After Burrraahh, Gulati took a year's break and finished her course at RADA, a drama school in London and also did some theater in Mumbai. Her second film was Romeo Ranjha in 2014.

In 2016, she appeared in director Vinnil Markan's film Zorawar, as Jasleen, opposite Yo Yo Honey Singh.

2017–present 
After a successful stint in Punjabi films, Gulati made her Television debut with TV Series, P.O.W.- Bandi Yuddh Ke for Star Plus which was directed by Nikkhil Advani. She played the role of a Pakistani girl Afreen, who is married to a P.O.W, Parul got lot of praise and appreciation for her portrayal of the Pakistani Urdu speaking girl. In 2018, she appeared in a web series Haq Se, directed by Ken Ghosh. She played the role of journalist Jannat Mirza, who is fighting for justice and to uphold the dignity of women in the state of Kashmir. This web series is based on the classic novel little women by Louisa May Alcott  into modern day tale of Kashmir and Parul has played Jo March  . In 2018, Gulati starred in Netflix series Selection Day based on Aravind Adiga's 2016 novel of the same name and Girls Hostel for The Viral Fever

Filmography

Films

Television

See also

List of Indian film actresses

References

External links
 

Actresses from Haryana
Indian film actresses
Actresses in Hindi cinema
Actresses in Punjabi cinema
Living people
Punjabi people
Punjabi Hindus
Punjabi women
People from Rohtak
Year of birth missing (living people)
Indian television actresses
Actresses in Hindi television
21st-century Indian actresses